Leptopelis zebra is a species of frog in the family Arthroleptidae. It is found in southern Cameroon south of Sanaga River and in Gabon.

Description
Adult males measure  and adult females  in snout–vent length. The canthus rostralis is rounded and indistinct. The dorsum has transverse dark bands. The venter is unspotted. The male advertisement call is a series of 3–4 deep, slow "hon" sounds, the last of which is more sonorous than the others. It may also emit a nasal, deep "konk" sound.

Habitat and conservation
Leptopelis zebra occurs in lowland rainforest in flat-bottomed valleys with slow-flowing streams. During the rainy season, they are found on the ground with puddles and water holes. Breeding takes place in standing water and marshes. Presumably, the eggs are deposited in nests on land, near water.

Leptopelis zebra is an uncommon species that is probably threatened by habitat loss caused by agricultural development, logging, and human settlements. Specimens from the Crystal Mountains and Ivindo National Parks tested negative for the pathogenic fungus Batrachochytrium dendrobatidis.

References

zebra
Frogs of Africa
Amphibians of Cameroon
Amphibians of Gabon
Amphibians described in 2001
Taxonomy articles created by Polbot